Horst Hächler (born 12 March 1926) is a German actor, film producer and director. He was married to the actress Maria Schell from 1957 to 1965.

Selected filmography
 The Orplid Mystery (1950)
 Beloved Life (1953)
 The Last Bridge (1954)
 Master of Life and Death (1955)
 Hubertus Castle (1973)
 Zwei himmlische Dickschädel (1974)
 The Hunter of Fall (1974)
 Silence in the Forest (1976)
 Inn of the Sinful Daughters (1978)
 Lethal Obsession (1987)

Director
 Love (1956)
 As the Sea Rages (1959)
 Murder in Rio (1963)
 Waldrausch (1977)
  (1983)

References

Bibliography
 Hannes Grandits & Karin Taylor. Yugoslavia's Sunny Side: A History of Tourism in Socialism (1950s-1980s). Central European University Press, 2010.

External links

1926 births
Possibly living people
Film people from Hamburg